The 2015–16 Central Michigan Chippewas women's basketball team represents Central Michigan University during the 2015–16 NCAA Division I women's basketball season. The Chippewas, led by ninth year head coach Sue Guevara, play their home games at McGuirk Arena as members of the West Division of the Mid-American Conference. They finished the season 22–11, 11–7 in MAC play to finish to be champions of the East division. They advanced to the championship game of the MAC women's tournament where they lost to Buffalo. They were invited to the Women's National Invitation Tournament where they lost in the first round to IUPUI.

Roster

Schedule and results
Source:  

|-
!colspan=9 style="background:#660033; color:#FFCC00;"| Non-conference games

|-
!colspan=9 style="background:#660033; color:#FFCC00;"| Mid-American Conference games

|-
!colspan=9 style="background:#660033; color:#FFCC00;"| MAC Women's Tournament

|-
!colspan=9 style="background:#660033; color:#FFCC00;"| WNIT

See also
 2015–16 Central Michigan Chippewas men's basketball team

References
2015–16 Central Michigan Media Guide

Central Michigan
Central Michigan Chippewas women's basketball seasons
2016 Women's National Invitation Tournament participants